This is a list of U.S. state representatives. This list contains the names of U.S. state representatives in the 25 states, listed alphabetically, from Alabama to Missouri.  For the remaining 25 states, please see List of U.S. state representatives (Montana to Wyoming).

Summary

Superlatives 

From the 50 state legislatures in the United States, the following superlatives emerge:

 Largest legislature: New Hampshire General Court (424 members)

 Smallest legislature: Nebraska Legislature (49 members)

 Largest upper house: Minnesota Senate (67 senators)

 Smallest upper house: Alaska Senate (20 senators)

 Largest lower house: New Hampshire House of Representatives (400 representatives)

 Smallest lower house: Alaska House of Representatives (40 representatives)

There are a total of 5,411 state representatives nationwide, with the average state house having 110 members.

Terminology for lower houses 

The 49 lower houses of state legislatures in the United States  Nebraska lacks a lower house  have various names:

 House of Representatives: 42 states;

 State Assembly: 4 states (California, Nevada, New York, and Wisconsin);

 House of Delegates: 2 states (Maryland and Virginia); and

 General Assembly: 1 state (New Jersey).

Alabama

Alaska

Arizona

Arkansas

California

Colorado

Connecticut

Delaware

Florida

Georgia

Hawaii

Idaho

Illinois

Indiana

Iowa

Kansas

Kentucky

Louisiana

Maine

Maryland

Massachusetts

Michigan

Minnesota

Mississippi

Missouri

See also 

 List of United States state legislatures
 List of U.S. state representatives (Montana to Wyoming)
 List of U.S. state senators

References 

Legislatures-related lists
Alabama
Representatives